Neohypoaspis is a genus of mites in the family Laelapidae.

Species
 Neohypoaspis ampliseta M. Delfinado-Baker, E. W. Baker & D. W. Roubik, 1983

References

Laelapidae